Maiwand District is situated in the western part of the Kandahar Province, Afghanistan. It borders Helmand Province to the west, Ghorak District to the north, Khakrez District to the northeast, Zhari District to the east, and Panjwayi District to the south. The population is 51,900 (2006). The district center is in Hutal, located in the central part of the district. Highway 1 runs through the center of the district and connects two of the major cities in southern Afghanistan, Kandahar and Lashkargah.

Battle of Maiwand

The Battle of Maiwand was fought at the village of Maiwand on 27 July 1880, during the Second Anglo-Afghan War. To this day a small fort remains from the British presence.

Operation Enduring Freedom
One casualty was Paula Loyd, a member of a Human Terrain System team, who was doused with a flammable liquid and set afire on November 4, 2008, and later died at Brooke Army Medical Center on January 7, 2009.

See also

 Maywand District murders

References

External links
 AIMS District Map

Districts of Kandahar Province